Udoka Oyeka is a Nigerian-American actor, director, and producer. He directed the short film, Down and Out, which was nominated in 3 categories, including best short film at the 2013 Africa Magic Viewers Choice Awards.

Early life and education
Udoka was born in Dallas, Texas. 2 years after he was born, his family moved from the United States back to Nigeria, where his parents were originally from. His father, Solomon Oyeka, was a chemical engineer while his mother, Florence Oyeka, was a civil servant. After completing high school in Lagos, Nigeria, Udoka returned to Texas where he attended the University of Texas, Arlington. Since his original passion was music, he decided to take a theatre elective which sparked his passion for acting and directing.

After graduating from the University of Texas with a degree in Accounting, he enrolled at the Theresa Bell Actors Studio where he studied acting for the screen. He supported himself through drama school by performing in community theatre.

Career
Udoka started his acting career by performing in school plays while in University. He also performed in Community theatre for two years to put himself through drama school
Upon his return to Nigeria, he released his first feature film, ZR-7: The Red House Seven in August 2011. Following that, he released his first short film, Down and Out which was nominated for the Best Short Film Award at the 2013 African Magic Viewer's Choice Awards.

In 2013, he directed a Cancer Awareness film titled "Living Funeral" which was produced by the Pink Pearl Foundation. The movie was nominated for 8 awards at the African Magic Viewers Choice Awards.

In 2018, he was nominated for the Most Promising Actor of the Year (English) Category at the City People Movie Awards.

Filmography

Movies He Directed
ZR-7 :The Red House Seven (2011)
Down and Out (2012)
Living Funeral (2013)
No Good Turn (2015)
Las Gidi Vice (2017)
Three Thieves (2019)
Listen (2020)
The Razz Guy (2021)
Price of Admission (2021)

Movies He Acted In
Tinsel (TV series)
Gidi Up (TV Series)
When Love Happens
No Good Turn (2015)
The First Lady (2015)
Lunch Time Heroes (2015)
Sylvia (2018)
Coming from Insanity (2019)

Awards

See also
 List of Nigerian actors
 List of Nigerian film directors

References

External links 
 

Living people
University of Texas at Arlington alumni
Nigerian male television actors
Nigerian film directors
1970 births